Blues is All Right is a studio album released by the blues guitarist Guitar Shorty (David Kearney). The album was released on CD by the label Collectables on August 27, 1996, the same day as the compilation album Billie Jean Blues. The album was produced by Swamp Dogg at several studios. The Penguin Guide to Blues Recordings says that this album is the superior of it and Billie Jean Blues due to more varied material.

Track listing 
"Introduction/The Blues Is All Right" (Kearney) — 12:19
"The Thrill Is Gone" (Rick Darnell, Roy Hawkins) — 8:45
"History of Jody" (Kearney) — 13:24
"How Blue Can You Get?" (Kearney) — 10:39
"Never Make Your Move Too Soon" (Kearney) — 10:21
"How Come My Dog Don't Bark (When You Come Around)" (Kearney) — 5:20
"Bump the Donkey" (Kearney) — 5:27
"Hard Life" (Kearney) — 2:33

Personnel 
Guitar Shorty — guitar, vocals
Mark Marymont — liner notes

References 

1996 albums
Guitar Shorty albums